190 Proof is a studio album by American country rap group The Lacs. It was released on April 3, 2012 via Average Joes Entertainment. Recording session took place at Phive Starr Stuidios in Atlanta. Production was handled by Shannon Houchins and Phivestarr Productions. It features guest appearances from Bubba Sparxxx and Crucifix. The album peaked at number 68 on the Billboard 200 albums chart in the United States.

Track listing

Charts

References

External links

2012 albums
The Lacs albums
Average Joes Entertainment albums